The John J. Moran Medium Security Facility is a medium-security state men's prison in Cranston, Rhode Island, owned and operated by the Rhode Island Department of Corrections.  The facility opened in 1992, and has an operational capacity of 1006 prisoners.

References

External links
John J. Moran Medium Security Facility

Prisons in Rhode Island
Buildings and structures in Cranston, Rhode Island
1992 establishments in Rhode Island